Matea Jelić (born 23 December 1997) is a Croatian taekwondo athlete. She is the 2020 Olympic champion in 67 kg.

She won the gold medal in the women's 67 kg event at the 2022 Mediterranean Games held in Oran, Algeria.

References

External links
 

1997 births
Croatian female taekwondo practitioners
Living people
Sportspeople from Split, Croatia
Sportspeople from Knin
Taekwondo practitioners at the 2014 Summer Youth Olympics
Mediterranean Games gold medalists for Croatia
Mediterranean Games medalists in taekwondo
Competitors at the 2018 Mediterranean Games
Competitors at the 2022 Mediterranean Games
European Taekwondo Championships medalists
Olympic taekwondo practitioners of Croatia
Olympic gold medalists for Croatia
Olympic medalists in taekwondo
Taekwondo practitioners at the 2020 Summer Olympics
Medalists at the 2020 Summer Olympics
21st-century Croatian women